Trump derangement syndrome (TDS) is a pejorative term, usually for criticism or negative reactions to former United States president Donald Trump that are perceived to be irrational, and presumed to have little regard towards Trump's actual policy positions, or actions undertaken by his administration. The term has mainly been used by Trump supporters to discredit criticism of his actions, as a way of reframing the discussion by suggesting that his opponents are incapable of accurately perceiving the world. Politico co-founder John Harris wrote that TDS is related to gaslighting, "another psychological concept in vogue in the Trump era." Journalists have used the term to call for restraint when judging Trump's statements and actions.

Origin of term

The origin of the term is traced to conservative political columnist and commentator Charles Krauthammer, a psychiatrist, who originally coined the phrase Bush derangement syndrome in 2003 during the presidency of George W. Bush. That "syndrome" was defined by Krauthammer as "the acute onset of paranoia in otherwise normal people in reaction to the policies, the presidency—nay—the very existence of George W. Bush". The first use of the term Trump derangement syndrome may have been by Esther Goldberg in an August 2015 op-ed in The American Spectator; she applied the term to "Ruling Class Republicans" who are dismissive or contemptuous of Trump. Krauthammer, in an op-ed harshly criticizing Trump, commented that—in addition to general hysteria about Trump—the "Trump Derangement Syndrome" was the "inability to distinguish between legitimate policy differences and... signs of psychic pathology" in his behavior.

Definition

Fareed Zakaria defined the syndrome as "hatred of President Trump so intense that it impairs people's judgment". CNN's editor-at-large Chris Cillizza called TDS "the preferred nomenclature of Trump defenders who view those who oppose him and his policies as nothing more than the blind hatred of those who preach tolerance and free speech". Pointing to previous allegations of Bush Derangement Syndrome and Obama Derangement Syndrome, Cillizza suggested, "Viewed more broadly, the rise of presidential derangement syndromes is a function of increased polarization—not to mention our national self-sorting—at work in the country today." Bret Stephens has described the term as something used by conservative groups whenever someone speaks out critically against Trump, regardless of political affiliation.

Political analyst John Avlon uses the term using a more generalized sense inclusive of positive emotions as well as hatred towards Trump, so that for example, TDS accounts for denialism about Trump’s defeat in the 2020 election, as a "political diagnosis" of people who "simply can’t accept the fact that he lost the election."

This new definition derogatorily describing the rabid nature of Trump followers rather than his deriders has been picked up by others and is now widely used.

Usage

The term has been widely applied by pro-Trump writers to critics of Trump, accusing them of responding negatively to a wide range of Trump's statements and actions.

The use of the term has been called part of a broader GOP strategy to discredit criticisms of Trump's actions, as a way of "reframing" the discussion by suggesting his political opponents are incapable of accurately perceiving the world. However, according to Kathleen Hall Jamieson of Annenberg Public Policy Center, the term could backfire on Trump supporters because people might interpret it to mean that Trump is the one who is "deranged", rather than those who criticize him. Some Trump supporters have asserted that he plays a form of "multi-dimensional chess" on a mental level his critics cannot comprehend, which they say explains why critics are frustrated and confused by Trump's words and actions. Fox News anchor Bret Baier and former House speaker Paul Ryan have characterized Trump as a "troll" who makes controversial statements to see his adversaries' "heads explode".

The term has been used by journalists critical of Trump to call for restraint. Fareed Zakaria, who urged Americans to vote against Trump calling him a "cancer on American democracy", argues that every Trump policy "cannot axiomatically be wrong, evil and dangerous". Adam Gopnik, who takes a strong anti-Trump position, responded to these assertions that it is a "huge and even fatal mistake for liberals (and constitutional conservatives) to respond negatively to every Trump initiative, every Trump policy, and every Trump idea". Arguing that Trump's opponents must instead recognize that the real problem is "Deranged Trump Self-Delusion", Gopnik defined the "Syndrome" as President Trump's "daily spasm of narcissistic gratification and episodic vanity".

Examples of use

Senator Rand Paul has cited the so-called syndrome several times. In a July 16, 2018, interview he said investigators should simply focus on election security and stop "accusing Trump of collusion with the Russians and all this craziness that's not true"—accusations which he said were entirely motivated by "Trump derangement syndrome".

Trump used the term in a tweet following the 2018 Russia–United States summit in Helsinki: "Some people HATE the fact that I got along well with President Putin of Russia. They would rather go to war than see this. It's called Trump Derangement Syndrome!" He also used it in a tweet about Alan Dershowitz's book The Case Against Impeaching Trump: ".@AlanDersh, a brilliant lawyer, who although a Liberal Democrat who probably didn't vote for me, has discussed the Witch Hunt with great clarity and in a very positive way. He has written a new and very important book called 'The Case Against Impeaching Trump', which I would encourage all people with Trump Derangement Syndrome to read!"

In July 2018, Jeanine Pirro accused Whoopi Goldberg of suffering from Trump Derangement Syndrome during a guest appearance on The View to promote her newly published book. This occurred while Pirro was responding to a question about how the "deep state" really works.

In July 2018, Eric Zorn wrote in the Chicago Tribune that the syndrome afflicts Trump's supporters more than his critics, as "what Team Trump is calling derangement is, in most cases, rational concern about his behavior and the direction he's taking the country.... The true Trump Derangement Syndrome loose on the land is the delusion suffered by those who still think he's going to make this country a better place for average people."

White House Press Secretary Sarah Huckabee Sanders also used the term in this tweet: "Trump Derangement Syndrome is becoming a major epidemic among Democrats. Instead of freaking out about the booming Trump economy why not celebrate it?"

In September 2018, Fox News personality and Trump supporter, Sean Hannity criticized The Washington Post as having Trump derangement syndrome for stating in an editorial that Trump, because of his attitude toward climate change, is "complicit" in hurricanes battering the United States; Hannity said "it is now a full-blown psychosis, it is a psychological level of unhingement I have never seen."

In November 2018, Michael Goodwin, writing in the New York Post, discussed a variant of Trump Derangement syndrome he called "Trump Imitation Syndrome".

In August 2019, Anthony Scaramucci, Trump's former White House Communications Director, said in interviews with Vanity Fair and CNN that he had "Trump fatigue syndrome" instead of Trump derangement syndrome.

In September 2019, Sean Hannity characterized as "Trump derangement syndrome" the continuing press coverage of Trump's days-long insistence that he was correct to state on September1 that Hurricane Dorian posed a danger to Alabama, asserting "pretty much every newsroom in America screwed this up and lied to you," adding there were "a lot of psychotic jackasses in the media mob".

See also 

 Clinton crazies

References

External links 

 

2015 neologisms
American political neologisms
Reactions to the election of Donald Trump
Donald Trump
Moral panic